The University of Science and Technology of China (USTC) is a public research university in Hefei, Anhui, China. Under direct leadership of the Chinese Academy of Sciences, the university is co-funded by the Academy, the Ministry of Education of China, and the Anhui Provincial Government. Because of its dominant leadership position and reputation in Science & Engineering research, USTC is often being described as “Caltech of China” or "China's Caltech".

The university was founded in Beijing by the Chinese Academy of Sciences in September 1958. In the beginning of 1970, the university moved to Hefei during the Cultural Revolution. The university was founded with the mission of addressing urgent needs to improve China's economy, defense infrastructure, and science and technology education. Its core strength is scientific and technological research, and more recently has expanded into humanities and management with a strong scientific and engineering emphasis. The university has 13 schools, 11 national research platforms, 8 science-education integration colleges, and 5 joint cooperative institutes with local governments. The university is a member of C9 League and the Double First Class University Plan. 

USTC consistently ranked in world's top 100 universities in the most-widely read university rankings in the world such as the Academic Ranking of World Universities, the Times Higher Education World University Rankings and the QS World University Rankings. Regarding scientific research output, the Nature Index 2022 ranked USTC 2nd in China and the Asia Pacific region, and 5th in the world among the global universities (after Harvard, Stanford, MIT, and UCAS).

History
The university was founded in Beijing by the Chinese Academy of Sciences (CAS) in September 1958. The Director of CAS, Mr. Guo Moruo was appointed the first president of USTC. USTC's founding mission was to develop a high-level science and technology workforce, as deemed critical for development of China's economy, defense, and science and technology education. The establishment was hailed as "A Major Event in the History of Chinese Education and Science." CAS has supported USTC by combining most of its institutes with the departments of the university. In 1959, USTC was listed in the top 16 national key universities, becoming the youngest national key university.

In the beginning of 1970, the university moved to Hefei during the Cultural Revolution.

Administration
 Bao Xinhe, President
 Shu Gequn, Party Secretary
 Zhou Guangzhao, Honorary President
 Bai Chunli, Honorary President

Presidents: 
 Guo Moruo, September 1958 – June 1978
 Yan Jici, February 1980 – September 1984
 Guan Weiyan, April 1985 – January 1987
 Teng Teng, January 1987 – February 1988
 Gu Chaohao, February 1988 – July 1993
 Tang Honggao, July 1993 – June 1998
 Zhu Qingshi, June 1998 – September 2008
 Hou Jianguo, September 2008 – January 2015
 Wan Lijun, March 2015 – June 2017
 Bao Xinhe, June 2017 – present

Present

Since its participation in the CAS Experimental Program of Knowledge Innovation, USTC has achieved a batch of important and innovative results in the basic research of nano science and technology, quantum information science, life science research, fire science and fire protection technology, polar scientific investigation and research, bio-mass clean energy research.

Rankings and reputation

General Rankings

USTC is generally considered one of the most competitive universities in the country, and consistently ranked among the top universities in Asia according to several major international university rankings. The joint THE-QS World University Rankings 2005 ranked USTC 4th in China (after Peking, Tsinghua and Fudan), 13th in Asia and 93rd in the world. The Times Higher Education World University Rankings 2011 placed USTC 49th in the world, 7th in Asia and 2nd in China after Peking. It ranked 10th in Asia and 4th in Emerging countries & Mainland China after (Tsinghua, Peking and Zhejiang) in 2020 by Times Higher Education.

As of 2022, the Times Higher Education World University Rankings ranked USTC 74th overall in the world.  The Academic Ranking of World Universities (ARWU), also known as the "Shanghai Ranking", placed USTC 62nd in the world, 7th in Asia , and 5th in China. The 2022 QS World University Rankings ranked USTC 93rd overall in the world. The 2023 US News Best Global Universities ranked USTC 102nd overall in the world and 5th in Mainland China. USTC is regarded as one of the most reputable Chinese universities by the Times Higher Education World Reputation Rankings where they ranked 51-60th globally.

Research Strength and Subject Rankings 
USTC has taken a leading position among Chinese universities on the number of high-quality research papers in science and engineering published internationally and in the citation rate of the papers. For example, the Nature Index Annual Tables 2022, which measures the largest groups of papers published in 82 leading high-quality science journals, ranks USTC the No.2 university in China and the Asia Pacific region, and 4th in the world among the global universities (after Harvard, Stanford, MIT, and UCAS). In 2021, USTC is ranked 57th globally by the Performance Ranking of Scientific Papers for World Universities with "Engineering" & "Life Science" related-fields ranked in the global top 10.

In the 2021 ARWU Global Ranking of Academic Subjects, the USTC had six disciplines in the world's top 20, 14 disciplines in the world's top 50 and 18 disciplines in the world's top 100.

Times Higher Education (THE)

Nature Index 
Nature Index tracks the affiliations of high-quality scientific articles and presents research outputs by institution and country on monthly basis.

Laboratories

Only the National Laboratories, State Key Laboratories, and Key Laboratories of the Chinese Academy of Sciences are listed below, among which the National Laboratories have the highest qualification. USTC is the only university in mainland China which possess two National Laboratories at the same time.

National Laboratories (2)
 The National Synchrotron Radiation Laboratory
 Hefei National Laboratory for Physical Sciences at the Microscale (under construction).

State Key Laboratories and Ministerial Level Units
 The State Key Laboratory of Fire Science (SKLFS)
 National High Performance Computing Center (Hefei)
 National Engineering Laboratory of Speech and Language Information Processing
 The State Key Laboratory of Particle Detection and Electronics (Under Construction)
 Mengcheng National Geophysical Observatory
 Microsoft Key Laboratory of Multimedia Computing and Communications, Ministry of Education

Key Laboratories of the Chinese Academy of Sciences
 The Key Laboratory of Bond Selective Chemistry, Chinese Academy of Sciences
 The Key Laboratory of Wu Wenjun Mathematics, Chinese Academy of Sciences
 The Key Laboratory of Quantum Information, Chinese Academy of Sciences
 The Engineering & Technology Research Center for Thermal Safety, Chinese Academy of Sciences
 The Key Laboratory of Material Mechanical Behavior and Material Design, Chinese Academy of Sciences
 The Key Laboratory of Structural Analysis, Chinese Academy of Sciences
 The Key Laboratory of Structural Biology, Chinese Academy of Sciences
 The Key Laboratory of Crust-Mantle Materials and Environment, Chinese Academy of Sciences
 Strong Magnetic Field Research Center, Chinese Academy of Sciences
 The Key Laboratory of Basic Plasma Physics, Chinese Academy of Sciences
 The Key Laboratory of Energy Conversion Materials, Chinese Academy of Sciences
 The Key Laboratory of Galaxies and Cosmology, Chinese Academy of Sciences
 The Network Communication System and Control Laboratory, Chinese Academy of Sciences (training building)
 The Key Laboratory of Soft Matter Chemistry, Chinese Academy of Sciences
 The Key Laboratory of Brain Function and Brain Disease, Chinese Academy of Sciences
 The Key Laboratory of Electromagnetic, Space, and Information, Chinese Academy of Sciences
 The Research Center of Solar Thermal Conversion, Chinese Academy of Sciences
 The Quantum Technology and Application Research Center, Chinese Academy of Sciences

Schools and Departments

Highlights: USTC set up the first graduate school in China in 1978 to effectively cultivate its postgraduate students.
 School for the Gifted Young
 School of Mathematical Sciences
 School of Physical Sciences
 Department of Modern Physics
 Department of Astronomy
 Department of Physics
 Department of Optics and Optical Engineering
 Physics Experiment Teaching Center
 School of Chemistry and Materials Science
 Department of Chemistry
 Department of Chemical Physics
 Department of Materials Science and Engineering
 Department of Polymer Science and Engineering
 Chemical Experimental Teaching Center
 School of Nuclear Science and Technology
 School of Life Science
 Molecular Biology and Cell Biology
 Neurobiology and Biophysics
 Systems Biology
 Biomedicine and Biotechnology
 School of Engineering Science
 Modern Mechanics
 Thermal Science and Energy Engineering
 Precision Machinery and Instrumentation
 School of Information Science and Technology
 Electronic Science and Technology
 Automation
 Electrical Engineering and Information Science
 Information Security
 School of Computer Science and Technology
 Computer Science and Technology
 School of Earth and Space Science
 Earth and Space Science
 Faculty of Geochemistry and Environmental Science
 School of Software Engineering
 School of Management
 Statistics and Finance
 Management Science
 Business Management (Information Management and Decision Science)
 Humanities and Social Science
 Sci-tech Communication and Sci-tech Policy
 The Teaching and Research Division of Marxism
 Scientific History and Archaeometry
 Center for Modern Art
 School of Environment Science and Electrooptical Technology
 School of Material Science and Engineering
 Suzhou Institute for Advanced Study, USTC
 Shanghai Institute for Advanced Studies, USTC
 Institute of Advanced Technology, USTC
 Continuing Education

Notable people

Alumni

Notable faculty members
 Zhou Guangzhao (1929–) – Famous theoretical physicist, Vice-chairman of the Standing Committee of the National People's Congress of China, Honorary President of USTC at present.
 Yan Jici (1901–1996) – Pioneer of Modern physics research and education in China, former Vice-president, President and Honorary President of USTC.
 Qian Linzhao (1906–1999) – Famous physicist and educator, pioneer of scientific history and education in China, former Vice-president of USTC.
 Hua Luogeng (1910–1985) – Pioneer of modern mathematics research and education in China, former Chairman of the Department of Mathematics and Vice-president of USTC.
 Guo Moruo (1892–1978) – A Chinese author, poet, historian, archaeologist, the first president of USTC.
 Meng Xuenong (1948–) – Former Mayor of Beijing, and former Governor of Shanxi Province
 Qian Xuesen (1911–2009) – Father of missiles of China, former Chairman of the Department of Mechanics with USTC.
 Zhao Zhongyao (1902–1998) – Pioneer of modern particle physics research and education in China, one of the first in the world to find positrons, former Chairman of the Department of Modern Physics with USTC.

See also
 University of the Chinese Academy of Sciences
 ShanghaiTech University
 Science and technology in China
 List of universities and colleges in Anhui
 List of universities in China

References

External links

 

 
1958 establishments in China
C9 League
Chinese Academy of Sciences
Educational institutions established in 1958
Project 211
Project 985
Plan 111
Universities and colleges in Anhui
Universities and colleges in Hefei
Vice-ministerial universities in China